Koechlin is a surname. It may refer to:

Persons
 Alphons Koechlin (1821–1893), Swiss politician and President of the Swiss Council of States (1874/1875)
 André Koechlin (1789–1875), French industrialist and the railroad equipment maker 
 Charles Koechlin (1867-1950), French composer
 Éric Koechlin  (1950-2014), French slalom canoer
 Jean Koechlin (born 1926), French botanist
 Jorge Koechlin (born 1950), Peruvian racing driver and magazine publisher
 Kalki Koechlin (born 1984) Indian actress of French parentage
 Maurice Koechlin (1856–1946), French structural engineer
 Pedro Koechlin von Stein,  Peruvian politician and entrepreneur
 Rudolf Koechlin (1862–1939), Austrian mineralogist

See also
Koechlin family, an Alsatian family
Koechlin Island, an island off the northeast coast of Adelaide Island, Antarctica